St Joseph's School is a senior secondary school founded in 2000 by the Roman Catholic Diocese of Agra Education Society in Noida. The society obtained the land for the project in 1993. Construction started on the first phase in 1995, and opened in 2000.

References

Schools in Noida
Primary schools in Uttar Pradesh
High schools and secondary schools in Uttar Pradesh
Educational institutions established in 1992
1992 establishments in Uttar Pradesh